The Landay is a traditional Afghan poetic form consisting of a single couplet. There are nine syllables in the first line, and thirteen syllables in the second. These short poems typically address themes of love, grief, homeland, war, and separation. The poetic form, traditionally sung aloud, was likely brought into Afghanistan by Aryan nomads thousands of years ago. "Landay," in Pashto, means "short, poisonous snake", likely an allusion to its minimal length and use of sarcasm.

Pronunciation/Etymology 
In Pashto, "landay (LAND-ee)" means "short, poisonous snake," likely an allusion to its minimal length and use of sarcasm. Landays (or landai) often criticize traditions and gender roles.

History 
Afghan culture values literature very highly, particularly classical Persian literature and Pashto literature and poetry.

Landays were likely brought into Afghanistan by Indo-Aryans around 1700 CE. The short songs became popular among farmers and nomads. Landai are traditionally performed by women.

Form
There are few formal properties. Each landay consists of a single, twenty-two syllable couplet. There are nine syllables in the first lines, and thirteen syllables in the second. In Pashto, the poem ends on a "ma" or "na" sound. The lines do not generally rhyme.

They are thought to be related to shloka.

Like the couplets of a ghazal, landai in sequence work "independently and sometimes can be grouped with others according to subject matter."

Themes
 War (Pashto: jang)
 Separation (biltoon)
 Patriotism (watan)
 Grief (gham)
 Love (meena)

Important Poets
 Rahila Muska
 Malalai

Examples 
 I Am the Beggar of the World by Eliza Griswold

Footnotes

References
 "Landay" in Glossary Terms.  Poetry Foundation, n.d. Web. 19 Feb. 2016 Web access
 Brooks, Mary Jo. "Pulling Back the Burka: A Glimpse of Afghan Life Through Poetry." Pulitzer Center on Crisis Reporting. Pulitzer Center, 20 June 2013. Web. 19 Feb. 2016.
 Griswold, Eliza. "LANDAYS." Poetry Foundation. Trans. Asma Safi. Poetry Foundation, n.d. Web. 19 Feb. 2016.
 Cestari, Elisa. "Landay Poetry in Afghanistan." Muftah. Muftah, 06 Aug. 2014. Web. 19 Feb. 2016.

Poetic forms